Koszalin (pronounced  ; ; formerly) is a city in northwestern Poland, in Western Pomerania. Koszalin is also a county-status city and capital of Koszalin County of West Pomeranian Voivodeship since 1999. Previously, it was a capital of Koszalin Voivodeship (1950–1998). The current mayor of Koszalin is Piotr Jedliński.

History

Middle Ages 

According to the Medieval Chronicle of Greater Poland (Kronika Wielkopolska) Koszalin was one of the Pomeranian cities captured and subjugated by Duke Bolesław III Wrymouth of Poland in 1107 (other towns included Kołobrzeg, Kamień and Wolin). Afterwards, in the 12th century the area became part of the Griffin-ruled Duchy of Pomerania, a vassal state of Poland, which separated from Poland after the fragmentation of Poland into smaller duchies, and became a vassal of Denmark in 1185 and a part of the Holy Roman Empire from 1227.

In 1214, Bogislaw II, Duke of Pomerania, made a donation of a village known as Koszalice/Cossalitz by Chełmska Hill in Kołobrzeg Land to the Norbertine monastery in Białoboki near Trzebiatów. New, mostly German, settlers from outside of Pomerania were invited to settle the territory. In 1248, the eastern part of Kołobrzeg Land, including the village, was transferred by Duke Barnim I to the Roman Catholic Diocese of Kammin.

On 23 May 1266, Kammin bishop Hermann von Gleichen granted a charter to the village, granting it Lübeck law, local government, autonomy and multiple privileges to attract German settlers from the west. When in 1276 the bishops became the sovereign in neighboring Kołobrzeg, they moved their residence there, while the administration of the diocese was done from Koszalin. In 1278 a Cistercian monastery was established, which took care of the local parish church and St. Mary chapel on Chełmska Hill.

The city obtained direct access to the Baltic Sea when it gained the village of Jamno (1331), parts of Lake Jamno, a spit between the lake and the sea and the castle of Unieście in 1353. Thence, it participated in the Baltic Sea trade as a member of the Hanseatic League (from 1386), which led to several conflicts with the competing seaports of at Kołobrzeg and Darłowo. From 1356 until 1417/1422, the city was part of the Duchy of Pomerania-Wolgast. In 1446 Koszalin fought a victorious battle against the nearby rival city of Kołobrzeg. In 1475 a conflict between the city of Koszalin and the Pomeranian duke Bogislaw X broke out, resulting in the kidnapping and temporary imprisonment of the duke in Koszalin.

Modern Age

As a result of German colonization, the town became mostly German-speaking, putting indigenous Slavic speakers at disadvantage. In 1516 local Germans enforced a ban on buying goods from Slavic speakers. It was also forbidden to accept native Slavs to craft guilds, which indicates ethnic discrimination.

In 1531 riots took place between supporters and opponents of the Protestant Reformation. In 1534 the city became mostly Lutheran under the influence of Johannes Bugenhagen. In 1568, John Frederick, Duke of Pomerania and bishop of Cammin, started constructing a residence, finished by his successor Casimir VI of Pomerania in 1582. After the 1637 death of the last Pomeranian duke, Bogislaw XIV, the city passed to his cousin, Bishop Ernst Bogislaw von Croÿ of Kammin. Occupied by Swedish troops during the Thirty Years' War in 1637, some of the city's inhabitants sought refuge in nearby Poland. The city was granted to Brandenburg-Prussia after the Treaty of Westphalia (1648) and the Treaty of Stettin (1653), and with all of Farther Pomerania became part of the Brandenburgian Pomerania.

Now renamed Cöslin as part of the Kingdom of Prussia, the city was heavily damaged by a fire in 1718, but was rebuilt in the following years. In 1764 on the Chełmska Hill, now located within the city limits, a Pole Jan Gelczewski founded a paper mill that supplied numerous city offices. The city was occupied by French troops in 1807 after the War of the Fourth Coalition. Following the Napoleonic wars, it became the capital of Fürstenthum District (county) and Regierungsbezirk Cöslin (government region) within the Province of Pomerania. The Fürstenthum District was dissolved on 1 September 1872 and replaced with the Cöslin District on December 13. Between 1829 and 1845, a road connecting Cöslin (Koszalin) with Stettin (Szczecin) and Danzig (Gdańsk) was built. Part of this road, from Cöslin (Koszalin) to the nearby town of Sianów, was built in 1833 by around one hundred former Polish insurgents.

The town became part of the German Empire in 1871 during the unification of Germany. The railroad from Stettin (Szczecin) through Cöslin (Koszalin) and Stolp (Słupsk) to Danzig (Gdańsk) was constructed from 1858 to 1878. A military cadet school created by Frederick the Great in 1776 was moved from Kulm (Chełmno) to the city in 1890.

After the Nazi Party took power in Germany in 1933, a Gestapo station was established in the city and mass arrests of Nazi opponents were carried out. After the Nazis had closed down Dietrich Bonhoeffer's seminar in Finkenwalde (Zdroje, Szczecin) in 1937, Bonhoeffer chose the town as one of the sites where he illegally continued to educate vicars of the Confessing Church. During the Second World War Köslin was the site of the first school for the "rocket troops" created on orders of Walter Dornberger, the Wehrmacht's head of the V-2 design and development program. The Nazis brought many prisoners of war and forced labourers to the city, mainly Poles, but also Italians and French. The Germans operated several forced labour camps in the city, including a subcamp of the Stalag II-B POW camp. Polish forced labourers constituted up to 10% of the city's population during the war. Germany also operated a prison in the city, with forced labour subcamps in the region. After crushing the Warsaw Uprising, the Germans brought several transports of Poles from Warsaw to the city, mainly women and children.

After World War II 

On 4 March 1945, the city was captured by the Red Army. Under the border changes forced by the Soviet Union in the post-war Potsdam Agreement, Koszalin became part of Poland as part of the so-called Recovered Territories. The city's German population that had not yet fled was expelled to the remainder of post-war Germany in accordance to the Potsdam Agreement. The city was resettled by Poles and Kashubians, many of whom had been expelled from Polish territory annexed by the Soviets.

As early as March 1945 a Polish police unit was established, consisting of former forced labourers and prisoners of war, however, the Soviets, still present in the city, plundered local industrial factories in April. From May 1945, life in the destroyed city was being organized, the first post-war schools, shops and service premises were established. In 1946, the first public library was opened, whose director was later Maria Pilecka, the sister of Polish national hero Witold Pilecki. In March 1946, the anti-communist Home Army 5th Wilno Brigade was active in Koszalin. In July 1947, the last units of the Soviet Army left Koszalin, and from that time only Polish troops were stationed in the city. In 1953 a local radio station was founded in Koszalin.

Initially, Koszalin was the first post-war regional capital of Polish Western Pomerania, before the administration finally moved to Szczecin in February 1946, after which the region was named the Szczecin Voivodeship. In 1950 this voivodeship was divided into a truncated Szczecin Voivodeship and Koszalin Voivodeship. In years 1950-75 Koszalin was the capital of the enlarged Koszalin Voivodeship sometimes called Middle Pomerania due to becoming the fastest growing city in Poland. In years 1975-98 it was the capital of the smaller Koszalin Voivodeship. As a result of the Local Government Reorganization Act (1998) Koszalin became part of the West Pomeranian Voivodeship (effective 1 January 1999) regardless of an earlier proposal for a new Middle Pomeranian Voivodeship covering approximately the area of former Koszalin Voivodeship (1950–75).

In 1991, Koszalin was visited by Pope John Paul II. On the fifth anniversary of his visit, his monument was unveiled in the city center.

Landmarks 
The city borders on Chełmska Hill, a site of pagan worship in prehistory, and upon which is now built the tower "sanctuary of the covenant", which was consecrated by Pope John Paul II in 1991, and is currently a pilgrimage site. Also an observation tower is located on the hill. At the entrance to the sanctuary there is a monument dedicated to the Polish November insurgents of 1831, who, imprisoned by Prussian authorities, built a road connecting Koszalin with nearby Sianów.

Koszalin's most distinctive landmark is the Gothic St. Mary's Cathedral, dating from the early 14th century. Positioned in front of the cathedral is a monument commemorating John Paul II's visit to the city.

Other city landmarks include the Park of the Dukes of Pomerania (Park Książąt Pomorskich), the Koszalin Museum, the main post office, the 16th-century Wedding Palace and the Culture Centre 105 (Centrum Kultury 105).

The city also has monuments dedicated to Polish national heroes: Józef Piłsudski, Władysław Anders, Kazimierz Pułaski, Władysław Sikorski, as well monuments of the 19th-century Polish poets Cyprian Norwid and Adam Mickiewicz.

Climate 
The climate is oceanic (Köppen: Cfb) with some humid continental characteristics (Dfb), usually categorized if the 0 °C isotherm is used (for the same classification). Being in Western Pomerania and near the Baltic Sea, it has a much more moderate climate than the other large Polish cities. The summers are warm and practically never hot as in the south and the winters are often more moderate than the northeast and east, although still cold, yet it is not as mild as Western Europe. Daily averages below freezing point can be found in January and February, while in the summer they are between 15 and 16 °C, relatively cool. The average annual precipitation is 704 mm, distributed during the year. Koszalin is one of the sunniest cities in the country.

Sports 

 AZS Koszalin - men's basketball team, playing in the Polish Basketball League (the top division)
 AZS Politechnika Koszalin - women's handball team playing in Polish Ekstraklasa Women's Handball League: 3rd place in 1st league in 2003/2004 season; promoted to Premiership in 2004/2005 season.
 Gwardia Koszalin - football team, currently playing in the fourth Polish division.
 Bałtyk Koszalin - football team, currently playing in the fourth Polish division
 Tennis - Bałtyk Koszalin
Rugby - Rugby Club Koszalin
 Motorsport - Klub Motor Sport Koszalin
 American Football - Korsarze Koszalin

Major corporations 

 Zakład Energetyczny Koszalin SA
 Brok Brewery SA
 NordGlass AutoGlass
 TWIP Foundation

Education 

 Koszalin University of Technology (Politechnika Koszalińska) 
 Baltic College (Bałtycka Wyższa Szkoła Humanistyczna)
 Air Force training center (Centrum Szkolenia Sił Powietrznych im. Romualda Traugutta)
 Koszalin University of Humanities (Koszalińska Wyższa Szkoła Nauk Humanistycznych)
 State Higher Vocational School in Koszalin (Państwowa Wyższa Szkoła Zawodowa w Koszalinie)
 Major Seminary of the Diocese of Koszalin-Kolobrzeska in Koszalin (Wyższe Seminarium Duchowne Diecezji Koszalińsko-Kołobrzeskiej w Koszalinie)
 Team State School of Music (Zespół Państwowych Szkół Muzycznych im. Grażyny Bacewicz)
 School Arts Team (Zespół Szkół Plastycznych im. Władysława Hasiora)
 1st. High School Stanisława Dubois (Dubois or colloquially Dibulec)
 2nd. High School Władysława Broniewskiego (colloquially Bronek)
 5th. High School Stanisława Lema (Jedności)
 6th. High School Cypriana Norwida (Podgórna)

Notable people 

 Daniel Liczko (1615–1662), Sergeant of the Dutch colonial army in New Amsterdam
 Ewald Christian von Kleist (1715–1759), poet and cavalry officer  
 Rudolf Clausius (1822–1888), physicist and mathematician and a founder of thermodynamics  
 Karl Adolf Lorenz (1837–1923), conductor, composer and music pedagogue
 Hans Richert (1869–1940), school reformer
 Hans Grade (1879–1946), aviation pioneer
 Fritz von Brodowski (1886–1944), German army general, controversially killed while in French custody during WWII
 Georg Wendt (1889–1948), politician, member of the SPD and SED 
 Friedrich-Karl Burckhardt (1889–1962), World War I flying ace
 Peter von Heydebreck (1889–1934), NSDAP politician
 Paul Dahlke (1904–1984), stage and film actor
 Heinz Pollay (1908–1979), dressage horse rider, competed in the 1936 and 1952 Summer Olympics
 Martin Ruhnke (1921–2004), musicologist
 Hans-Joachim Preil (1923–1999), actor and comedian
 Leslie Brent (1925–2019), immunologist and zoologist
 Waltraud Nowarra (1940–2007), chess player
 Vladimir Berdnikov (born 1946), painter and glass artist
 Mirosław Okoński (born 1958), footballer, played 418 pro games and 29 for Poland
 Kuba Wojewódzki (born 1963), journalist, TV personality, drummer and comedian
 Mirosław Trzeciak (born 1968), footballer, director of sport development of Legia Warszawa
 Marcin Horbacz (born 1974), modern pentathlete, competed at the 2008 Summer Olympics
 Adam Sztaba (born 1975), composer, music producer, conductor, arranger and pianist
 Maciej Stachowiak (born 1976), software engineer at Apple Inc.
 Kasia Cerekwicka (born 1980), pop singer
 Marzena Diakun (born 1981), conductor
 Jakub Różalski (born 1981), artist and illustrator
 Paweł Spisak (born 1981), equestrian, competed at the 2004, 2008, 2012 and 2016 Summer Olympics
 Sebastian Mila (born 1982), footballer
 Santall (born 1983), musician
 Schwesta Ewa (born 1984), musician, moved to Germany as a child
 Joanna Majdan (born 1988), chess player

Twin towns – sister cities

Koszalin is twinned with:

 Albano Laziale, Italy
 Bourges, France
 Fuzhou, China
 Gladsaxe, Denmark
 Ivano-Frankivsk, Ukraine
 Kristianstad, Sweden
 Lida, Belarus
 Neubrandenburg, Germany
 Neumünster, Germany
 Schwedt, Germany
 Seinäjoki, Finland
 Tempelhof-Schöneberg (Berlin), Germany
 Trakai, Lithuania

See also
Museum of Vladimir Vysotsky in Koszalin

References

External links 
 Official City Authorities site
 Technical University of Koszalin
 ChefMoz Dining Guide
 Unofficial Forum of Koszalin's Community
 Koszalin in Your Wonder Beautiful Place
 KoszalinCity.pl 
 Heimatkreis Köslin (German refugee's organization)

Media 

Głos Pomorza, regional daily newspaper
Głos Koszaliński, regional daily newspaper
Radio Koszalin, regional radio station
Radio Północ, regional radio station
Telewizja Polska Szczecin, regional TV station
TV MAX, regional TV station

 
1266 establishments in Europe
Cities and towns in West Pomeranian Voivodeship
City counties of Poland
Members of the Hanseatic League
13th-century establishments in Poland